ACP 125 is the short name for Allied Communications Publication 125: Communications Instructions—Radiotelephone Procedures, developed and published by the Combined Communications Electronics Board, for use by the Five Eyes nations and the rest of NATO. According to the latest version, "The aim of ACP 125 is to prescribe the voice procedure for use by the armed forces of Allied nations on secure and non-secure tactical voice nets. Its purpose is to provide a standardized way of passing speech and data traffic as securely as possible consistent with accuracy, speed and the needs of command and control."The standard defines the procedures for communicating by voice over two-way radio, and has served as the basis for radio communications procedures for many non-military organizations, as well as numerous U.S. government organizations, including the United States Department of State and the Civil Air Patrol. 

First published as ACP 125(A) in about 1951, the current version is ACP 125(G), published in 2016. The standard itself is ACP 125, with the letter in parenthesis indicating the major revision level. There are at least two supplements, including: 

 ACP 125 U.S. SUPP-1: HF Air-Ground Radiotelephone Procedures U.S. Supplement 1 to ACP 125(B) 
 ACP 125 (US SUPP-2): Radiotelephone Procedures for the Conduct of Artillery and Naval Gunfire (U)

International use 
Although the standard is designed for use by all NATO countries, especially when operating in conjunction with each other, some efforts have been made in the past to translate the procedure words into the native language of member countries. For example, NATO memo SGM-623-56 from 1956, French Equivalents to English Expressions Used in ACP 125(B), includes the following table of prowords:

See also 

 ACP 131

External links 

 Defense Standardization Program: International Standardization Documents

References 

Military standardization